Sheri Hunt is an American researcher and former rugby union player. She was a member of the  squad that won the inaugural 1991 Women's Rugby World Cup in Wales. She also featured at the 1994 and 1998 Rugby World Cups.

Hunt earned a Bachelor of Science degree in Chemistry and Mathematics from the University of Florida. She then attained a Master of Science degree in Physical Chemistry and a Ph.D. in Biophysical Inorganic Chemistry from the University of California, San Diego.

Hunt and the 1991 World Cup squad were inducted into the United States Rugby Hall of Fame in 2017.

References 

Year of birth missing (living people)
Living people
Female rugby union players
American female rugby union players
United States women's international rugby union players